Orhan Adaş (15 March 1916 – September 1984) was a Turkish fencer. He competed in the individual and team sabre events at the 1936 Summer Olympics. He had a career as an architect in later life.

References

External links
 

1916 births
1984 deaths
Turkish male sabre fencers
Olympic fencers of Turkey
Fencers at the 1936 Summer Olympics
Date of death missing